Göztepe S.K. are a Turkish multi-discipline sports club, founded in 1925, in İzmir, Turkey. Colloquially known by its football department, the club owns several titles in domestic competitions in Turkey, including 1 titles at Turkish Football Championship in 1950, 2 titles at Turkish Cup in 1968–69, 1969–70 editions, and 4 titles at TFF First League at 1977–78, 1980–81, 1998–99 and, 2000–01 seasons. The club also reached semi-finals at Inter-Cities Fairs Cup in 1968–69 edition, as well as quarter-finales of UEFA Cup Winners' Cup in 1969–70 season.

Below is the list of head coaches of football department of Göztepe S.K., including the respective honours achieved during spells.

List

References
Notes

Citations

External links
Göztepe S.K. official website

 
Goztepe
Göztepe S.K. managers